Ali Haddani (born 1936 in Fes-died 2007) was a Moroccan songwriter. Some of his songs include "Yak a jarhi", "Qitar Al Hayat", "Kif idir a sidi", "Bared ou skhoun", "Ya dmouîi ya ghla ma âandi", and "Asidi ana hor".

Moroccan songwriters
1936 births
2007 deaths
People from Fez, Morocco
20th-century Moroccan male singers